Belaya Rus is a Belarusian public association founded on 17 November 2007 to support President Alexander Lukashenko. Since then, the organisation's leaders have regularly announced that they are ready to become a political party. President Lukashenko neither firmly opposed the idea, nor supported it. He has made comments such as: "Well, if they are ready, let them be a party, I am not against it. On the contrary, I will support it because they are patriots. But I wouldn't advise them to hurry." The party is based on the idea of the All-Russia People's Front. It has no real ideology outside of absolute support for Lukashenko. The former minister of Education of Belarus, Alexander Radkov was chairman of the association from 2007 to 2018. The NGO has a membership of over 180,000.

Gennady Davydko, the head of  the Belarusian TV and Radio Company, was elected chairman of Belaya Rus in a unanimous vote by the association's council on 19 January 2018.

Notes

References

External links 
  

2007 establishments in Belarus
Alexander Lukashenko
Political parties established in 2007
Political parties in Belarus